Debbie A. Rodella (born November 28, 1961) is an American politician who served as a member of the New Mexico House of Representatives from 1993 to 2018. A Democrat, she represented Legislative District 41 located in Rio Arriba, Santa Fe, and Taos Counties. She lost the Democratic primary in 2018 to Susan K. Herrera.

Early life and education
A native and lifelong resident of Española, New Mexico, Rodella received her associate degree from Northern New Mexico Community College and attended the College of Santa Fe.

Career 
She worked as a materials science technician and as a secretary. Rodella is married to Thomas Rodella, the former sheriff of Rio Arriba County who was removed from office after his federal felony convictions in September 2014 on multiple civil rights charges. They have two children.

New Mexico House of Representatives
Rodella was first elected to the 70-seat New Mexico House of Representatives in 1992. Running unopposed in both primary and general elections since 2006, Rodella was re-elected to a twelfth consecutive two-year term in November 2014. Rodella serves as the chair of the House Business & Industry Committee, Interim Chair of the Economic and Rural Development Committee, and a member of both the Voters & Elections and the Rules & Order of Business Committees. In 2013, Rodella voted with Republicans to block a same-sex marriage bill in committee, and against a bill (which passed) to reduce the penalties for the possession of marijuana. Rep. Rodella has been accused of sharing funds contributed to her re-election campaigns with her husband, to use in his own races for political office.

In the 2018 Democratic primary, Rodella ran for re-election but lost to Susan K. Herrera.

References

External links
 
Legislature page

1961 births
Living people
People from Española, New Mexico
Northern New Mexico College alumni
Santa Fe University of Art and Design alumni
Women state legislators in New Mexico
Democratic Party members of the New Mexico House of Representatives
21st-century American politicians
21st-century American women politicians